KFJK may refer to:

 KFJK-LD, a defunct low-power television station (channel 19, virtual 29) formerly licensed to serve Santa Fe, New Mexico, United States
 KMJ-FM, a radio station (105.9 FM) licensed to serve Fresno, California, United States, which held the call sign KFJK from 2005 to 2009